Dermomurex olssoni is a species of sea snail, a marine gastropod mollusk in the family Muricidae, the murex snails or rock snails.

Description
The length of the shell varies between 20 mm and 24 mm. It is described as a fossil.

Distribution
This species occurs in the Caribbean Sea off Honduras and the Dominican Republic; and in the Atlantic Ocean off the Bahamas.

References

 Merle D., Garrigues B. & Pointier J.-P. (2011) Fossil and Recent Muricidae of the world. Part Muricinae. Hackenheim: Conchbooks. 648 pp. page(s): 214

External links
 

Gastropods described in 1989
Dermomurex